My Giant Nerd Boyfriend is an autobiographical comic by Malaysian artist Fishball, following Fishball and her tall, nerdy boyfriend. The comic has been the fourth-most popular work from the publisher Webtoon, with 158 million views in 2019, and was nominated for a Ringo Award for Best Humor Comic.

Premise 
My Giant Nerd Boyfriend is an autobiographical comic about its creator, Fishball, and her tall nerdy boyfriend. A slice-of-life one-shot humor comic, it includes strips based on their relationship, her boyfriend's nerdy activities, the effects of their different height, and life in Malaysia. One review described the boyfriend as "patient, devoted, and puts up with her nuttiness with the personality of a shaggy dog."

Publication and adaptation 
My Giant Nerd Boyfriend is created by Fishball, who is from Malaysia and was 27 years old during 2017. The comic is published on Webtoon and began publication in March 2017.  it publishes three times a week and has over 600 strips. , the comic was edited by Bekah Caden.

The comic was adapted into a short animated series which was published on YouTube in July 2019. There are ten episodes, each four minutes or less.

Reception 
Webtoon reported that in 2019, My Giant Nerd Boyfriend was its fourth-most popular comic, with 158 million views in that year.  it has 2.1 million subscribers on Webtoon.

The comic was nominated in 2018 for a Ringo Award for Best Humor Comic.

Writing for The A.V. Club, Oliver Sava called it "a delightful slice-of-life comic" that "delivers addictive, adorable short strips". Brittany Wong wrote in HuffPost that the comic was "for couples who are basically just two grown kids in love".

References 

2017 webcomic debuts
Malaysian webcomics
Malaysian webtoons
Slice of life comics
Comedy webcomics
Comedy webtoons
Autobiographical webcomics
Autobiographical webtoons